The Anoka-Hennepin School District 11 is a school district in Minnesota, northwest of Minneapolis and Saint Paul. The district serves 13 communities: All of Anoka, Champlin and Coon Rapids, and parts of Andover, Blaine, Brooklyn Center, Brooklyn Park, Dayton, Fridley, Ham Lake, Nowthen, Oak Grove and Ramsey. The district's name refers to its geographic span over two counties: it covers the southern portion of Anoka County and the northeast part of Hennepin County. The district was formed in 1920 and in 1952 after dozens of small rural school districts voted to consolidate.

The superintendent is Mr. David Law, who has since taken up a position with Minnetonka Schools. An interim will be named in June to serve a year. As of the 2012–13 school year, it is the largest school district in Minnesota with an enrollment of 37,880, students in grades K–12. Additional students attend pre-k programs as well as adults who are earning a diploma or GED through the district's Adult Basic Education program.

School Board
Anoka-Hennepin is governed by a board whose members are elected to four-year terms.

Controversy

Between 2009 and 2011, nine students in Anoka-Hennepin committed suicide; the area is designated by state health officials as a "suicide contagion area." Many of these students were gay or perceived by their classmates to be gay, leading to bullying. The district is the subject of a federal investigation by the U.S. Department of Justice and the Office for Civil Rights in the U.S. Department of Education over the climate of anti-gay harassment and discrimination based on sex, including peer-on-peer harassment based on not conforming to gender stereotypes.

The district received criticism for its Sexual Orientation Curriculum Policy (Feb. 2009) because it stated that teachers should be neutral when addressing issues of sexual orientation in their classrooms. Critics said this "neutrality policy" prevented acceptance and open discussion of LGBT people and issues in schools, and was essentially a "gag order" on teachers. District administration attempted to clarify the policy by explaining its anti-bullying and harassment policies specifically name sexual orientation as a protected class of people. The Sexual Orientation Curriculum Policy stated teachers can address issues of sexual orientation in their classes provided the discussion is age-appropriate, fact-based and connected to the curriculum. In July 2011, the Southern Poverty Law Center and the National Center for Lesbian Rights filed a lawsuit against the district because of this policy. The lawsuit was filed on behalf of five current and former students who say that they were discriminated against because of their real or perceived sexual orientation and that teachers and district officials facilitated said violence and discrimination; a sixth student was added to the lawsuit a month later.

On February 13, 2012, the policy was repealed and replaced by a vote of 5–1 with a new Respectful Learning Environment Policy. The former policy required district staff to "remain neutral on matters regarding sexual orientation," while discussing such topics "in a respectful manner that is age-appropriate, factual, and pertinent to the relevant curriculum." By comparison, the new policy states, "It is not the District's role to take positions on these issues. Teachers and educational support staff shall not attempt in the course of their professional duties to persuade students to adopt or reject any particular viewpoint with respect to these issues." It states that such discussions, "shall be appropriate to the maturity and developmental level of students; be of significance to course content; and be presented in an impartial, balanced and objective manner, allowing respectful exchange of varying points of view." Finally, the new policy states that, "In the course of discussions of such issues, district staff shall affirm the dignity and self-worth of all students, regardless of their race, color, creed, religion, national origin, sex/gender, marital status, disability, status with regard to public assistance, sexual orientation, age, family care leave status or veteran status."

Schools and facilities

Elementary schools
 Adams Elementary School
 Andover Elementary School
 Brookside Elementary School
 Champlin Elementary School
 Crooked Lake Elementary School
 Dayton Elementary School
 Eisenhower Elementary School
 Evergreen Park World Studies Elementary School
 Franklin Elementary School
 Hamilton Elementary School
 Hoover Elementary School
 Jefferson Elementary School
 Johnsville Elementary School
 Lincoln Elementary School for the Arts
 L.O. Jacob Elementary School
 Madison Elementary School
 McKinley Elementary School
 Mississippi Elementary School
 Monroe Elementary School
 Morris Bye Elementary School
 Oxbow Creek Elementary School
 Park View Early Childhood Center
 Peter Enich Kindergarten Center
 Ramsey Elementary School
 Riverview Specialty School for Math and Environmental Science
 Rum River Elementary School
 Sand Creek Elementary School
 Sorteberg Elementary School
 Sunrise Elementary School
 University Avenue Elementary School
 Washington Elementary School
 Wilson Elementary School

Middle schools
 Anoka Middle School for the Arts (Fred Moore and Washington campuses)
 Coon Rapids Middle School
 Jackson Middle School
 Northdale Middle School
 Oak View Middle School
 Roosevelt Middle School

Senior high schools
 Andover High School
 Anoka High School
 Blaine High School (includes the Center for Engineering, Mathematics and Science)
 Champlin Park High School
 Coon Rapids High School
The district runs five specialized programs for high school students:
 Crossroads Alternative High School
 Secondary Technical Education Program (STEP)
 Compass Alternative School (1st–12th grade)
 Project Lead The Way
 College in the Schools (CIS)

Other sites
 Bell Center
 Bridges Program
 Early Childhood at the Family Center Mall
 Educational Service Center (district office)
 Family Welcome Center
 Learning Center and Distribution Complex (houses Community Education Department, Early Childhood Special Education and Special Education departments)
 Transition Plus

Non-District schools
These public charter, private, or parochial schools are located within the Anoka-Hennepin School District but are not affiliated.
 Cross of Christ
 Epiphany Catholic School
 Legacy Christian Academy
 Northwest Passage High School
 Saint Stephens Catholic School
 PACT Charter School (public)

See also
 List of school districts in Minnesota

References

Further reading

External links
 Anoka-Hennepin School District 11 Official Website

Suburban Minneapolis School Districts
Education in Anoka County, Minnesota
Education in Hennepin County, Minnesota